Jaggan (Sindhi: جاڳڻ) is a village in Shikarpur Taluka in Shikarpur District (a famous district in Sindh province) Pakistan.

According to some sources the population of village estimates 8000. It is connected with Sukkur-Jacobabad highway, Sultan Kot and Ramzanpur.

Populated places in Shikarpur District